Victor Croome (30 November 1899 – 1 September 1973) was an English cricketer. A right-handed batsman and occasional wicket-keeper, he played first-class cricket for the Royal Air Force between 1928 and 1930.

Biography

Born in Westminster, London in 1899, the son of Gloucestershire player Arthur Croome, Victor made his first-class debut for the RAF against the Army in 1928. He also played against the Royal Navy the same year. He played against the same opponents in 1929.

After a final match for the RAF against the Army in 1930, the remainder of his recorded cricket career took place in the Far East. He played for the Straits Settlements against the Federated Malay States in 1932 and 1933, and for Malaya against Hong Kong and Shanghai in Hong Kong in 1933. He died in Essex in 1973.

References

1899 births
1973 deaths
People from Westminster
English cricketers
Malayan cricketers
Straits Settlements cricketers
Royal Air Force cricketers